The Sorority Stakes is an American Thoroughbred horse race held annually during the first week of September at Monmouth Park Racetrack in Oceanport, New Jersey. Open to two-year-old fillies, it is contested on dirt over a distance of six furlongs.

The Sorority Stakes lost its graded status in 2004.

Records
Speed record:
 1:09.00 Ruffian (1974)

Most wins by a jockey:
 3 – Braulio Baeza (1967, 1968, 1973)
 3 – Joe Bravo(1999, 2009, 2020)

Most wins by a trainer:
 3 – Ben W. Perkins Jr. (2000, 2001, 2002)

Most wins by an owner:
 3 – Wheatley Stable (1961, 1963, 1968)

Winners

Notes

References
 History of the Sorority stakes at Monmouth Park

1956 establishments in New Jersey
Horse races in New Jersey
Monmouth Park Racetrack
Flat horse races for two-year-old fillies
Previously graded stakes races in the United States
Ungraded stakes races in the United States
Recurring sporting events established in 1956